Richard Normand Langlois (born January 20, 1952 in Putnam, Connecticut) is an American economist and currently professor at the University of Connecticut. He studied physics and English literature at Williams College, he received a Master's in astronomy from Yale University, and he received his PhD in Engineering-Economic Systems from Stanford.

Since May 2008, Langlois is also a contributor to the blog Organizations and Markets.

He is attributed with first presenting the Vanishing Hand theory.

Literature

 1982, Subjective Probability and Subjective Economics. New York : NY, C.V. Starr Center for Applied Economics, NYU, FAS, Department of Economics, Working Paper
 1984, Kaleidic and Structural Interpretations of Genuine Uncertainty. New York : NY, C.V. Starr Center for Applied Economics, NYU, FAS, Department of Economics, Working Paper
 1986, Economics as a Process: Essays in the New Institutional Economics. New York: Cambridge University Press, 1986. xi, 262 p. : ill. ; 24 cm. 
 1988, “Economic change and the boundaries of the firm,” Journal of Institutional and Theoretical Economics, vol. 144, pp. 635–57
 1994, “Risk and Uncertainty” in Peter Boettke (ed.), The Elgar Companion to Austrian Economics. Brookfield, Vermont : Edward Elgar Publishing, pp. 118–22.
 1995, Firms, markets, and economic change : a dynamic theory of business institutions / Richard N. Langlois and Paul L. Robertson. London ; New York : Routledge, 1995. xii, 185 p. : ill. ; 24 cm.  (hbk.),  (pbk.)
 1998, “Capabilities and the theory of the firm,” in N. J. Foss and B. J. Loasby (eds.), Economic Organisation, Capabilities and Co-ordination. London: Routledge.
 2007, The dynamics of industrial capitalism : Schumpeter, Chandler, and the new economy / Richard N. Langlois. Abingdon [England] ; New York, NY : Routledge, 2007.

References

External links
Homepage

21st-century American economists
University of Connecticut faculty
Williams College alumni
Living people
1952 births